Buchwaldoboletus sphaerocephalus is a species of bolete fungus in the family Boletaceae native to Europe, North America and Southwest Australia.

Taxonomy and naming 
Originally described by Jean-Baptiste Barla as Boletus sphaerocephalus in 1859, it was given its current name by Roy Watling & Tai Hui Li in 2004.

Description 
The cap is convex, glabrous, silky and tomentose, viscid when wet. Its color is yellow to yellow-fulvus. The pores are small, tubes short, adnate ventricose, and context yellow, bluing when bruised. The stipe is fleshy, ventricose, and there is a yellow mycelium at the stipe base.

Spores are ovoid, pale ochraceous and measure 5.5–7.2 by 3.3–4.5 µm.

Distribution and ecology 
Buchwaldoboletus sphaerocephalus has been recorded in Europe, North America and Southwest Australia, growing in clusters on sawdust of pines, often in enclosed areas.

References

External links 

 

Boletaceae
Fungi described in 1859
Fungi of Europe
Fungi of North America
Fungi of Australia